Fake Famous is a 2021 documentary film directed by Nick Bilton. It is a social experiment involving three non-famous people who attempt to become social media influencers by "faking" fame. They use tactics such as buying followers and faking a luxurious lifestyle. The documentary follows their progress and discusses issues related to social media.

Reception 
On Rotten Tomatoes, a review aggregator, the film received a score of 73% based on 15 reviews. Journalists described the documentary as a social experiment, interesting, and condescending.

See also 
 Eighth Grade, a 2018 film with a similar theme.
 Ingrid Goes West, a 2017 film with a similar theme.
 Internet Famous, a 2016 mockumentary film with a similar theme.
 Not Okay, a 2022 film with a similar theme.

References

External links 
 
 
 

2021 films
2021 documentary films
American documentary films
Films about social media
2020s English-language films
Films scored by Michael Abels
2020s American films